Helen Bohen O'Bannon (1939 – October 19, 1988) was an economist and the Secretary of Public Welfare for the Commonwealth of Pennsylvania.

Helen O'Bannon was born in 1939 in Ridgewood, New Jersey. She majored in economics at Wellesley College and later earned a master's degree at Stanford. O'Bannon was an associate dean at the Carnegie Institute between 1973 and 1976, where she strove to make the university more accessible to women.

In 1976 O'Bannon published an economics text titled Money and Banking: Theory, Policy, and Institutions' (Harper and Row). O'Bannon was Pennsylvania's Secretary of Public Welfare from 1979 until 1983, when she returned to academia, becoming the first woman to hold the position of vice president at the University of Pennsylvania. She died on October 19, 1988, after a long illness.

References

External links
 
 1975-1992: Timeline of Women at Penn, University of Pennsylvania Archives - Mark Frazier Lloyd, July 2001
 Free to Choose - Media - A complete transcript from the discussion panel from volume four of the 1980 Milton Friedman PBS documentary "Free to Choose"

1939 births
1988 deaths
American women economists
People from Ridgewood, New Jersey
Wellesley College alumni
Stanford University alumni
Women in Pennsylvania politics
20th-century American economists
20th-century American women scientists
20th-century American scientists
Economists from New Jersey